CBVG may refer to:

 CBVG-FM, a radio rebroadcaster (88.5 FM) licensed to Gaspe, Quebec, Canada, rebroadcasting CBVE-FM
 CBVG-TV, a television retransmitter (channel 18) licensed to Gaspe, Quebec, Canada, retransmitting CBMT